The first whitewater slalom race took place on the Aar River in Switzerland in 1933. The early slalom courses were all set in natural rivers, but when whitewater slalom became an Olympic sport for the first time, at the 1972 Munich Games, the venue was the world's first concrete-channel artificial whitewater course, the Eiskanal in Augsburg.  All Olympic whitewater slalom competitions have taken place in artificial courses, which now exist in 16 countries on five continents.

Streambed slalom courses still outnumber concrete channels, but most international competition takes place in the more controlled environment of an artificial course. Within those parameters, designs vary. Water diversion features can be natural rocks, shaped concrete boulders and wing dams, plastic bollards, wooden dams, or truck tires. Channel walls can be straight or slanted, and smooth or cobbled. The floor of the channel may have raised turbulence generators to slow the water speed. The course may be a single straight channel, parallel channels, one or more loops, or a figure-8.

Water can be supplied by diversion from a nearby river, tidal current, electric pumps, or a combination.  The expense of operation is largely dependent on the water source.  A single channel on the Olympic model — a  drop at 17 m³/s — represents one megawatt of energy, either supplied by pumps or sacrificed in the case of diversion around a hydroelectric generator.  Ironically, diversion is often more expensive than pumping if the diverted water would have made a bigger drop inside the hydroelectric facility.  The extreme example of this is the Ocoee Whitewater Center where water must bypass a  drop in a dam, tunnel, and penstock, in order to water the 9-meter drop of the whitewater course.

Most artificial whitewater courses cover their operating costs by charging passengers for guided raft rides.  Canoe and kayak slalom training and competition do not generate enough revenue.

The four riverbed courses on this list are all extensively engineered and used for major competitions.  Ocoee is no longer used for slalom, but it was the 1996 Olympic venue.  The other courses on the list have concrete channels, often built in former industrial canals or mill races.  Every city that hosts a summer Olympics is now expected to build a spectacular new whitewater stadium, usually powered by electric pumps.  The Lee Valley White Water Centre, constructed for the London 2012 Summer Olympics, cost £31million.

In the table below, the location of each facility for which there is no Wikipedia article is noted in the Comment column.  If the facility is more than two years old, there is often a good satellite or aerial (bird's eye) picture available via the link.

 
Artificial whitewater courses